is a fictional anthropomorphic bird from the Star Fox series of video games. He was created by Shigeru Miyamoto and designed by Takaya Imamura. Falco acts as the wingman and best friend of the titular Fox McCloud for the majority of the series.

Falco first appeared in the 1993 video game Star Fox. Since then, he has appeared in multiple Star Fox games. A variety of voice actors have lent their voice to the character in English language releases, whereas Hisao Egawa portrayed Falco in the majority of the Japanese language releases. He was, however, replaced by Kōsuke Takaguchi, starting with Star Fox 64 3D. Hisao briefly reprised his role in Super Smash Bros. for Nintendo 3DS and Wii U. Besides the Star Fox games, Falco has starred in his own manga, and also appears as a playable character in the Super Smash Bros. games beginning with Melee.

Falco was based on the model designer of the original Star Fox game. Reception to the character has been mixed, with popularity among fans. He has been mainly criticized for his appearance and contentious attitude, but praised for being far less annoying than other characters in the series. The reaction to his appearance in the Super Smash Bros. series was also been similarly mixed, with some reviewers objecting to his moves being cloned from Fox, citing it as an example of low effort on the part of the developers.

Characteristics
Falco's name and hooked beak suggests that he is a falcon of some kind, with some official material referring to him as a falcon, most likely a red-throated caracara. On the contrary, the color of his feathers and the shape of his tail feathers resembles that of a pheasant, more specifically the Mikado pheasant and Edwards's pheasant. Interviews with the original developers reveal that Falco was originally intended to be a pheasant. Super Smash Bros. for Wii U and Super Smash Bros. Ultimate make reference to this in the Palutena's guidance easter egg.

Falco's body feathers are blue, with red caruncles around his eyes. His beak is large, yellow and hook-shaped. His build has varied from being somewhat stocky in Star Fox to more of a slim build in Star Fox Assault.

Falco originally wore a jumpsuit with a flight jacket and gray tanker boots in Star Fox, like the other characters. His jumpsuit was orange in color, which he retained in Star Fox 64. In Star Fox Adventures, he wore a leather vest over a white shirt, leather pants, a white headband, and sunglasses. In Star Fox Assault, he wore a flashy red and silver long-sleeve jumpsuit with exaggerated shoulder guards. In Star Fox Command, he returned to his Star Fox and Star Fox 64 attire, although his jumpsuit is red instead of orange.

"Lombardi" is the only surname for the original Star Fox team that Dylan Cuthbert of Q-Games did not come up with. Instead, it came from 2D artist and scenario designer Takaya Imamura. While the character's first name, "Falco", is the genus for raptors that includes falcons and kestrels, Falco's surname in the Japanese versions, "Rambaldi", was taken from Carlo Rambaldi, an Italian special effects artist who worked on films such as Close Encounters of the Third Kind and E.T. the Extra-Terrestrial. The original four members of the Star Fox Team are based on the team for the first game. Falco in particular is based on the model designer, Watanabe. During the events of Star Fox 64, Falco is 19 years old.

Falco started as the head of a galactic gang, and possesses an uncooperative attitude, though he is devoted to the pilots he flies with.
Falco is one of the most respected and skilled pilots of the Star Fox Team. His personality in general is brash and cocky. Falco has incredible nerves and is able to accurately predict the tide of battle on most occasions.

Appearances
Falco initially appeared in the first Star Fox game for the Super Nintendo Entertainment System. He subsequently appeared in the sequel, Star Fox 64 for the Nintendo 64. In both games, he served as a member of the Star Fox Team, but a minor character nonetheless. Falco often acts as backup for Fox in the games, spinning in to take up Fox's flank. After the defeat of Andross at the end of Star Fox 64, Falco disappears, and is not seen for a significant time. Falco does not appear during the majority of Star Fox Adventures, as he could not be properly integrated into the plot in time for the game's release. He also appeared in Star Fox: Assault, and Star Fox Command.

In other media
Outside in the Star Fox series. Falco Lombardi made his first appearance in the Super Smash Bros. series in its second installment, Super Smash Bros. Melee, with a similar set of moves to that of Fox. In Melee, Falco is the fourth-most viable character in competitive play. Falco returned for Super Smash Bros. Brawl, Super Smash Bros. for Nintendo 3DS and Wii U and Super Smash Bros. Ultimate as a playable character, trophies, and spirits. Falco is one of the game's fastest characters, and performs his moves very quickly. He jumps higher than Fox and uses a similar reflecting shield, blaster, and Landmaster tank. In Melee, Falco's appearance is based on his design in Star Fox 64, his design in Brawl and Super Smash Bros. for Wii U and 3DS is based on his appearance in Star Fox: Assault and Star Fox Command, while his design in Super Smash Bros. Ultimate combines elements from his appearance in Star Fox Zero and the previous two Super Smash Bros. games. In the Nintendo Switch version of Starlink: Battle for Atlas, Falco makes an appearance along with the other members of the Star Fox team. They join forces with the Starlink team to save Atlas from the Forgotten Legion. Farewell, Beloved Falco is a manga series that detailed the eight-year gap between Star Fox 64 and Star Fox Adventures. In the manga, Falco receives a request for help from Katt Monroe, leaving the Star Fox Team. At the end of the manga, he stays with Katt Monroe, while Fox returns to the team, and stays away for a long absence.

Reception
Falco is a favorite among Star Fox fans, and among Nintendo fans in general. Though he could be described as "cranky", Falco gained esteem as a counterpoint to the seemingly annoying Slippy Toad and the older Peppy Hare. UGO Networks listed Falco as one of the top twenty-three second in commands in entertainment, characterizing him as a "dick", but the most reliable character in the Star Fox series. They also ranked him fifth on its "25 Most Memorable Italians in Video Games" list. CraveOnline ranked Falco as the tenth "Greatest Nintendo Characters" describing him as the Han Solo to Fox McCloud's Luke Skywalker. Falco was also placed among by GamesRadar in a list of 10 sidekicks that deserve their own games. On other hand, he has been labeled as a "douchebag"; Complex listed him on their list of 25 "douchiest" video game characters, as "Falco's ego was too big for the team", and he was ranked sixth on Joystick Division's "The Top Ten Biggest Douchebags in Video Game History" for the same reason.

The portrayal of Falco in the Super Smash Bros. series has been both praised and criticized. While IGN noted that Falco operated a bit differently than Fox in the game, and did so in a "cool black jacket" (in reference to one of his alternate costumes), he was essentially a simple clone of the controllable Fox McCloud. IGN also cited Falco as proof that Masahiro Sakurai did not appear to care about producing original characters with unique move sets. UGO Networks called Falco a lame "purple-feathered bird who wears a white jacket and silver boots", but still recognizes the effectiveness of his fighting style. Jeremy Parish of Polygon ranked 73 fighters from Super Smash Bros. Ultimate "from garbage to glorious", listing Falco as 27th and stated that "you get the impression Falco ended up in Smash against his own better judgment, and you can't help but respect such a well-developed sense of duty even as you sympathize with his frustrations". Gavin Jasper of Den of Geek ranked Falco as 55th of Super Smash Bros. Ultimate characters, criticizing and stating that "Falco does the same as Fox moves", and claiming the character design was a "waste".

References

Animal characters in video games
Anthropomorphic birds
Anthropomorphic video game characters
Extraterrestrial characters in video games
Fictional birds of prey
Fictional mercenaries in video games
Fictional military personnel in video games
Fictional space pilots
Male characters in video games
Nintendo protagonists
Star Fox characters
Super Smash Bros. fighters
Video game characters introduced in 1993
Video game characters who can move at superhuman speeds